is a city in Fukushima Prefecture, Japan. , the city has an estimated population of 322,996 people in 141760 households, and a population density of 430 persons per km2. Kōriyama is designated as a core city and functions as a commercial center for Fukushima Prefecture. Kōriyama is the third largest conurbation in the Tōhoku region.

Geography and climate
Kōriyama is located in the center of the Nakadōri region of Fukushima Prefecture in the Tōhoku region of Japan. The Adatara Mountains are to the north, Lake Inawashiro is to the west, and the Abukuma Highlands are to the east. The Abukuma River flows through downtown Kōriyama. The downtown area extends to the west of Kōriyama Station.

Neighboring municipalities 
Sukagawa
Aizu-Wakamatsu
Nihonmatsu
Tamura
Motomiya
Otama
Ten-ei
Hirata
Miharu
Ono
Inawashiro

Climate
Kōriyama has a humid continental climate (Köppen Cfa) characterized by hot wet summers and cool, quite dry winters.

Demographics
Per Japanese census data, the population of Kōriyama has increased over the past 60 years.

History
Kōriyama originated as a regional governmental center in the Nara period, when the area was on the frontier of Yamato settlement of the Tōhoku region. The surrounding area developed into shōen controlled by various samurai clans in the Heian and Kamakura periods. Nearby centers, such as Nihonmatsu developed into castle towns, Kōriyama remained as a commercial center and thrived as a post town because of its importance as a traffic focal point into the Edo period and was part of the territory of Nihonmatsu Domain.

With the establishment of the modern municipalities system on April 1, 1889, the town of Kōriyama was established within Asaka District.  In the early Meiji period, many dispossessed samurai were assigned undeveloped lands in the area to reclaim and as a result, the population grew and region developed into an agricultural center. The relative abundance of hydroelectric power also helped with the development of local industry.

Kōriyama was raised from town to city status on September 1, 1924 with the annexation of neighboring Odawara Village. Kuwano Village was likewise annexed on June 1, 1925. During the 1930s, Kōriyama was noted a center for military equipment production. It was thus a target for American bombers during World War II, and the city was subject to three large-scale air raids during the war.

From 1954 to 1955, Kōriyama expanded by annexing the town of Otsuki and portions of the villages of Tomita and Iwae, and in 1965 annexed the villages of Nishida and Nakata. In 1997, the city received core city designation, giving it increased autonomy from national and prefectural governments.

On March 11, 2011, the Great East Japan Earthquake caused damage, but Kōriyama is located outside of the mandatory evacuation zone set by the Japanese government after the Fukushima Daiichi nuclear disaster. Many people from the evacuation zone relocated to Kōriyama. On 30 July 2020, a shabu-shabu restaurant exploded, damaging an area spanning several hundred meters.

Government
Kōriyama has a mayor-council form of government with a directly elected mayor and a unicameral city legislature of 38 members. The city contributes nine members to the Fukushima Prefectural Assembly. In terms of national politics, Kōriyama is part of the Fukushima 2nd Electoral District, which includes neighbouring Nihonmatsu, Motomiya and Adachi District.

Mayors

1st: Yoshiya Ōmori (大森吉弥、1925–1929)
2nd: Jun Wada (和田 潤, 1929–1937)
3rd: Hachirō Murai (村井 八郎, 1937–1940)
4th: Ujirō Seki (関 卯次郎, 1940–1942)
5th: Hachikurō Ōshima (大島 破竹郎, 1942–1947)
6th: Shichiji Itō (伊藤 七司, 6 April - 2 May 1947)
7th: Zenko Honma (本間 善庫, 1947–1951)

8th: Morishige Tanji (丹治 盛重, 1951–1959)
9th: Hiyoshi Hidese (秀瀬 日吉, 1959–1977)
10th: Takashi Takahashi (高橋 堯, 1977–1985)
11th: Hisashi Aoki (青木 久, 1985–1993)
12th: Eiji Fujimori (藤森 英二, 1993–2005)
13th: Masao Hara (原 正夫, 2005–2013)
14th: Masato Shinagawa (品川萬里, current)

Sources:

Economy
Kōriyama city is called the "commercial capital in Fukushima" and the economic bloc is the biggest in Fukushima Prefecture.

Principal companies headquartered in Koriyama
XEBIO; sporting goods
Kourakuen; ramen noodle shop chain
York Benimaru; large supermarket retailer with networks in south Tōhoku, Nigata, and North Kanto
Banks headquartered in Koriyama
Daito Bank
Toho Bank

Transportation
Kōriyama is an important transportation hub, as it is located in the center of Fukushima Prefecture and is the nexus of several railway lines and expressways. Kōriyama Station is the central station for the city. However, Kōriyama does not have an airport.

Railway

JR East - Tōhoku Shinkansen

JR East -  Tōhoku Main Line
 - Kōriyama - 
JR East -  East Ban'etsu Line
Kōriyama - 
JR East -  West Ban'etsu Line
Kōriyama -  -  - ] -  - 
JR East -  Suigun Line
Kōriyama - Asaka-Nagamori -  -

Highway

  - Asaka PA - Kōriyama-minami IC - Kōriyama IC - Kōriyama JCT
  - Kōriyama-higashi IC - Kōriyama JCT - Gohyakugawa PA - Bandai-Atami IC

Media

Television
Fukushima Central Television (Nippon Television chain)
Fukushima Broadcasting (TV Asahi chain)
CATY
Information Network Kōriyama

Radio
FM Fukushima (JFN)

Newspaper
Fukushima Mimpō (Fukushima, Mainichi chain)
Fukushima Minyū (Fukushima, Yomiuri chain)
Kahoku Shinpō (Sendai)

Education

Universities and colleges
Nihon University, Faculty of Engineering
Ohu University
Kōriyama Women's University & Colleges
Kōriyama Women's University Junior College
Open University of Japan, Fukushima Learning Center

Senior high schools
Kōriyama has ten public high schools operated by the Fukushima Prefectural Board of Education and six private high schools

Public (prefectural)
Asaka High School
Asaka Mitate Branch High School
Asaka Reimei High School
Kōriyama High School
Kōriyama Higashi High School
Kōriyama Shōgyō High School
Kōriyama Kita Kōgyō High School
Asaka Kaisei High School
Konan High School
Kōriyama Hōsei High School

Private
Tohoku High School of Nihon University
Shōshi Gakuen Shōshi High School
Teikyō Asaka High School
High School affiliated with Kōriyama Women's Colleges

Junior high schools

Public
Koriyama First Junior High School
Koriyama Second Junior High School
Koriyama Third Junior High School
Koriyama Fourth Junior High School
Koriyama Fifth Junior High School
Koriyama Sixth Junior High School
Koriyama Seventh Junior High School
Tomita Junior High School
Asaka Junior High School
Asaka Second Junior High School
Ōtsuki Junior High School
Mihota Junior High School
Futase Junior High School
Nishida Junior High School
Katahira Junior High School

Kikuta Junior High School
Midorigaoka Junior High School
Moriyama Junior High School
Hiwada Junior High School
Meiken Junior High School
Koharada Junior High School
Kohken Junior High School
Miyagi Junior High School
Ose Junior High School
Konan Junior High School
Mitate Junior High School
Takase Junior High School
Atami Junior High School

Private
Xaverio Junior High School

Multi-level schools
Fukushima Korean School ( - North Korean international school

Noted people from Koriyama

Takeshi Honda, Figure skater
Toru Iwaya, Mezzotint engraver, painter
Miki Nagasawa, voice actress
, Japanese idol and voice actress
Toshiyuki Nishida, actor
 Saga (Alice Nine), musician
Masashi Ohuchi, Olympic weightlifter
Toshio Tamogami, chief of staff of Japan Air Self-Defense Force
Joji Yuasa, composer
Hidekaz Himaruya, creator Hetalia
Takumi Nemoto, Politician (Minister of Health, Labour and Welfare)
GReeeeN, band

Twinnings

Japanese sister cities
 Nara, Nara (since 5 August 1971)
 Kurume, Fukuoka (since 3 August 1975)
 Tottori, Tottori (since 25 November 2005)

International relations
 Brummen, Netherlands, sister city since 25 June 1988

Local attractions

Festivals
Kōriyama Uneme Festival
Koriyama Summer Festival - an Oktoberfest-style festival.
Koriyama Autumn Festival - includes children's activities, taiko and mikoshi parades.

National Historic Sites
Ōyasuba Kofun

References

External links

 
Koriyama City Guide 2017 (Japanese/English)

 
Cities in Fukushima Prefecture